Out to Win is a 1923 British silent drama film directed by Denison Clift and starring Catherine Calvert, Clive Brook and Irene Norman. It was based on the 1921 play Out to Win by Dion Clayton Calthrop and Roland Pertwee.

Cast
 Catherine Calvert - Auriole Craven
 Clive Brook - Barraclough / Altar
 Irene Norman - Isobel
 Cameron Carr - Harrison Smith
 A. B. Imeson - Ezra Phipps
 Ivo Dawson - Lawrence
 Olaf Hytten - Cumberston
 Norman Page - Van Diet
 Robert English - Lord Altmont Frayne
 Ernest A. Douglas - Hilbert Torrington
 James McWilliams - Doran
 Daisy Campbell - Mrs. Barraclough
 Ernest A. Dagnall - Sydney

References

External links
 

1923 films
British drama films
British silent feature films
Films directed by Denison Clift
1923 drama films
British films based on plays
Ideal Film Company films
British black-and-white films
1920s English-language films
1920s British films
Silent drama films